Abruptio is a 2023 American horror film featuring lifelike puppets written, edited, and directed by Evan Marlowe. Marlowe also served as director of photography. Produced by Barry Finlayson, Kerry Marlowe, Martin White, and Susan Finlayson, the film stars James Marsters, Christopher McDonald, Jordan Peele, Robert Englund, and Sid Haig in his final film before his death on September 21, 2019.

Abruptio had its world premiere online at the Santa Monica Film Festival on January 17, 2023.

Premise

Cast

Production

Voice recording 
Voice recording started on May 23, 2015, in Los Angeles, California, with Evan Marlowe serving as cinematographer. Recording sessions wrapped on December 2, 2017. In December 2017, several actors were confirmed to have voiced characters, including James Marsters, Robert Englund, Sid Haig, Jordan Peele, Hana Mae Lee, and Christopher McDonald.

Production 
On September 23, 2019, the film's crew relayed their feelings towards the passing of co-star Sid Haig, while confirming they would finish production on Abruptio soon, for a then-projected release in 2020. In April 2020, Marlowe revealed information about the film's production: 

In a June 2020 interview, the film's director Evan Marlowe revealed that with "six years in, we're still not quite halfway done filming. We plan to pick up where we left off in the coming months." In August 2020, production resumed, with coronavirus safety protocols in place, including limited crew members. Filming wrapped on March 4, 2021, before post-production wrapped by March 2022. In August 2022, the film was completed.

Release 
Abruptio had its world premiere online at the Santa Monica Film Festival on January 17, 2023. The film also streamed online at the Cinequest Film & Creativity Festival on March 1, 2023, before its physical screening in August 2023. It has been named an Official Selection of the Fantaspoa Film Festival, Panic Film Fest and Days of the Dead Film Festival.
The film was originally set for release in 2021.

References

External links 
 
 

2020s English-language films
2023 animated films
2023 films
2023 horror films
2023 independent films
American horror films
American independent films
Film productions suspended due to the COVID-19 pandemic
Films postponed due to the COVID-19 pandemic
Films scored by Patrick Savage
Films shot in Los Angeles
Puppet films
English-language horror films